Huygens software refers to different multiplatform microscope image processing packages from Scientific Volume Imaging, made for restoring 2D and 3D microscopy images or time series and analyzing and visualizing them.

The restoration is based on different deconvolution algorithms, that permit the recovery of objects from images that are degraded by blurring and noise. In microscopy the blurring is largely due to diffraction limited imaging by the instrument; the noise is usually photon noise.

The scientific visualization of 3D volume data is based on the simulated fluorescence process algorithm (SFP), but isosurfaces and maximum intensity projections are also used for object analysis and colocalization.

Huygens software is named after the Dutch physicist Christiaan Huygens who is perhaps best known for his argument that light behaves like waves. Since
wave diffraction plays a key role in the Huygens Software, it was named after him.

External links
Scientific Volume Imaging home page
SVI-wiki on 3D microscopy and deconvolution

Image processing software